Chinese Taipei competed at the 2013 Summer Universiade in Kazan, Russia from 6 July to 17 July 2013. 136 athletes are a part of the Taipei team.

Chinese Taipei has won 15 medals, including 4 gold medals.

References

Nations at the 2013 Summer Universiade
2013
2013 in Taiwanese sport